A list of publisher codes for (978) International Standard Book Numbers with a group code of zero.

Assignation

The group-0 publisher codes are assigned as follows:

2-digit publisher codes

3-digit publisher codes
(Note: the status of codes not listed in this table is unclear; please help fill the gaps.)

4-digit publisher codes
(Note: many codes are not yet listed in this table; please help fill the gaps.)

5-digit publisher codes
(Note: many codes are not yet listed in this table; please help fill the gaps.)

6-digit publisher codes
(Note: many codes are not yet listed in this table; please help fill the gaps.)

7-digit publisher codes
(Note: many codes are not yet listed in this table; please help fill the gaps.)

See also
 List of group-1 ISBN publisher codes
 List of ISBN identifier groups

References

External links
 https://www.isbn-international.org/range_file_generation
 http://www.books-by-isbn.com/
 List of 2 and 3-digit publisher codes for ISBNs that start with a 0 from http://blog.openlibrary.org/2009/07/20/isbn-publisher-codes/ where there is also a complete list of publisher codes for ISBNs that start with a 0 or 1.

Book publishing
Bookselling
Book terminology
Checksum algorithms
Identifiers
International Standard Book Number
0
Unique identifiers